Schwedenplatz (German for Sweden Square) is a square in central Vienna, Austria.

It was previously called Ferdinandplatz, but was renamed after World War I to thank Sweden for sending aid to Austria.

The Schwedenplatz station of the Vienna U-Bahn lines U1 and U4 is located at this square.

References

Innere Stadt
Squares in Vienna
Austria–Sweden relations